Patanitretus is a genus of ground beetles in the family Carabidae. This genus has a single species, Patanitretus pakistanensis. It is found in Pakistan.

References

Carabidae